Ilona Kalyuvna Korstin (born May 30, 1980) is a retired Russian basketball forward of Estonian origin, who competed for her native Russia at the 2004 Summer Olympics, the 2008 Summer Olympics and the 2012 Summer Olympics, winning two bronze medals. She ended her career in 2013.

She is CEO at the VTB United League

Honors and achievements

International
 Olympics Bronze Medal (2): 2004, 2008
 World Championship Silver Medal (2): 2002, 2006
 EuroBasket (3): 2003, 2007, 2011

Club
 Bourges Basket
 Euroleague (1): 2001
 Ligue Féminine (2): 1999, 2000

 VBM-SGAU Samara (CSKA Moscow)
 Euroleague (1): 2005
 Russian Premier League (3): 2004, 2005, 2006
 Russian Cup (4): 2004, 2006, 2007, 2008
 World League (4): 2003, 2004, 2005, 2007

 Spartak M.R. Vidnoje
 Euroleague (1): 2010
 Europe SuperCup (2): 2009, 2010

 Dynamo Moscow
 EuroCup (1): 2013

Individual
Honored Master of Sports of Russia
Medal of the Order For Merit to the Fatherland, 1st class (2 August 2009) - for outstanding contribution to the development of physical culture and sports, high achievements in sports at the Games of the XXIX Olympiad in Beijing in 2008

Notes

References
Profile

External links
Official website

1980 births
Living people
Basketball players at the 2004 Summer Olympics
Basketball players at the 2008 Summer Olympics
Basketball players at the 2012 Summer Olympics
Medalists at the 2004 Summer Olympics
Medalists at the 2008 Summer Olympics
Olympic basketball players of Russia
Olympic bronze medalists for Russia
Olympic medalists in basketball
Phoenix Mercury draft picks
Recipients of the Medal of the Order "For Merit to the Fatherland" I class
Russian people of Estonian descent
Russian women's basketball players
Shooting guards
Basketball players from Saint Petersburg